James McIntyre is a Scottish international lawn and indoor bowler.

McIntyre made his Scottish debut in 1994.

He won double bronze in the triples and fours at the 2000 World Outdoor Bowls Championship in Johannesburg before winning a gold medal in the triples at the 2004 World Outdoor Bowls Championship in Ayr with Willie Wood and David Peacock.

References

Living people
Scottish male bowls players
Bowls World Champions
Year of birth missing (living people)